Jamelle Antoine Bouie (born April 12, 1987) is an American columnist for The New York Times. He was formerly chief political correspondent for Slate.  David Uberti, writing in the Columbia Journalism Review in 2019, called Bouie "one of the defining commentators on politics and race in the Trump era".

Early and personal life 
Bouie was born and raised in Virginia Beach, Virginia. He attended Floyd E. Kellam High School, from which he was graduated in 2005. He was graduated from the University of Virginia in 2009, with a Bachelor of Arts degree, with majors in political and social thought and government. While there, he began blogging, which eventually led to interest in a career in journalism.

Career 
Bouie was awarded a writing fellowship for The American Prospect in 2010. He was awarded a Knobler Fellowship at the Nation Institute by The Nation in 2012. Bouie became a staff writer for The Daily Beast in 2013, writing about national politics. He moved to Slate as a chief political correspondent in 2014. He joined The New York Times as a columnist in 2019. 

Bouie was a contributor to Barack Obama and the New America: The 2012 Election and the Changing Face of Politics, a 2013 book edited by political scientist Larry Sabato. 

Bouie has been a political analyst on CBS News since 2015. He frequently appears on Face the Nation, the network's Sunday morning show, and contributed to the network's 2016 election night coverage. 

Bouie writes articles focusing on history, public policy, and national politics, including the 2016 U.S. presidential election. He also writes about entertainment, such as science fiction, comics, and film.

Bouie has written extensively on racial politics, including slavery in the United States and the American Civil War, the killing of Trayvon Martin, the Ferguson unrest, the Charleston church shooting, and the Black Lives Matter movement. His writing on racial and national politics subjects is often quoted by other journalists.

Shortly after Donald Trump was elected president in 2016, he wrote an article for Slate arguing that there was "no such thing as a good Trump voter". Several days earlier, he compared Trump voters to the "angry, recalcitrant whites" who resisted the Reconstruction era after the American Civil War. He has criticized the media for an unwillingness to label racism in the United States as "racist", opting instead for terms such as "racial" and "racially charged". He also criticized the media for its "horse-race" coverage of the 2016 presidential election. He said the NPR interview between Noel King and Jason Kessler was "absolute journalistic malpractice". 

The New York Times announced that Bouie would join their lineup of opinion columnists in January 2019. The newspaper stated that Bouie has "consistently driven understanding of politics deeper by bringing not only a reporter’s eye but also a historian’s perspective and sense of proportion to bear on the news. His interests ... range well beyond politics to the visual arts, food and movies." On January 24, 2023 he wrote of the need to examine the motivation behind the focus of speeches being given in the national campaign of Florida Governor DeSantis. Bouie suggests that his prior legislative history provides deeper understanding of why he is controlling a narrative intended to attract the voting population he would like to draw away from former President Trump as they approach their party nomination for the 2024 presidential election. He provides journalistic approaches that can redirect the narrative toward topics of more concern to voters who would be adversely affected by his positions on topics not being discussed.

Bouie is also an accomplished photographer. His first public photography exhibition, in 2019, focused on towns in Oklahoma founded by former slaves in the nineteenth century. He shoots using both digital and film cameras.

Recognition 
In 2012, Bouie was chosen for The Roots Root Top 100. The site stated that "his is a strong, influential and necessary voice during the 2012 election season and beyond".

Forbes recognized Bouie in its "30 Under 30 – Media" list in 2015, saying that "he became a leading voice on the Ferguson story".

References

External links 

1987 births
21st-century American journalists
21st-century American male writers
African-American journalists
American male journalists
CBS News people
Journalists from Virginia
Journalists from Washington, D.C.
Living people
People from Virginia Beach, Virginia
Slate (magazine) people
The New York Times columnists
University of Virginia alumni
Writers from Charlottesville, Virginia
21st-century African-American people
20th-century African-American people